Andrea Accordi is an Italian chef working in Percorso Restaurant in Four Seasons Hotel Lion Palace Saint-Petersburg.  He became the first chef to receive the Michelin star in Eastern Europe.

Career 
Accordi began his career in Mantua in northern Italy. He then spent some time in London, Switzerland, and Saint Tropez. He received his first Michelin star as the chef of Villa La Vedetta in Florence (Italy). In 2007 he moved to Prague, where in 2008 he received his second Michelin star, the first Michelin star awarded in the so-called Eastern Bloc. He won further stars in 2009 and 2010, making his third and fourth career stars. His work in Prague was due to end in October 2011, when he planned to move to Saint Petersburg as a chief in first Four Seasons hotel in Russia. He was appointed as CEO of Four Seasons hotel in Bangkok in 2019.

Awards
Michelin star (Villa Le Vedetta) Florence
Michelin star (Allegro) Prague

References

Sources 
 Andrea Accordi (cz)
 Andrea Accordi – the chef who was awarded Prague's first Michelin star
 Michelin Guide: Main cities of Europe 2008, Prague

Year of birth missing (living people)
Living people
Italian chefs
Head chefs of Michelin starred restaurants
Businesspeople from Prague
Italian chief executives